That Old Black Magic is a 1965 album by Keely Smith, with arrangements by Ernie Freeman.

Reception
The initial Billboard magazine review from 4 September 1965 commented that "The famous deadpan one re-creates her hits of the past and brings new excitement and color to the wildest performance of her career".

Track listing
 "I've Got the World on a String" (Harold Arlen, Ted Koehler) – 2:23
 "When You're Smiling" (Larry Shay, Mark Fisher, Joe Goodwin) – 1:42
 "The Sheik of Araby" (Harry B. Smith, Francis Wheeler, Ted Snyder)
 "I Gotta Right to Sing the Blues" (Arlen, Koehler) – 3:25
 "The Birth of the Blues" (Ray Henderson, Buddy G. DeSylva, Lew Brown) – 2:47
 "Oh, Baby" (K. Smith, P. Smith) – 2:22
 "That Old Black Magic" (Arlen, Johnny Mercer) – 2:43
 "Just a Gigolo" (Irving Caesar, Leonello Casucci, Julius Brammer) – 3:32
 "I Ain't Got Nobody" (Spencer Williams, Roger A. Graham)
 "Autumn Leaves" (Joseph Kosma, Mercer) – 3:00
 "Buona Sera" (Peter De Rose, Carl Sigman) – 2:51
 "Pennies from Heaven" (Arthur Johnston, Johnny Burke) – 2:21

Personnel
Keely Smith – vocals
Ernie Freeman – arranger
Jimmy Bowen – producer

References

External links
 

1965 albums
Albums arranged by Ernie Freeman
Albums produced by Jimmy Bowen
Reprise Records albums
Keely Smith albums